Salvia aerea is a perennial plant that is native to Sichuan, Guizhou, and Yunnan provinces in China, typically growing on hillsides, grasslands, forests, and thickets at  elevation.

The plant is used medicinally.

Notes

aerea
Flora of China